Nikolay Ivanov, Nikolai Ivanov, or Nikola Ivanov may refer to the following notable people:

 Nikola Ivanov (1861-1940), Bulgarian general
 Nikolaj Ivanov (astronomer), Soviet astronomer and discoverer of asteroids
 Nikolay Ivanov (composer), film music composer, see Total Denial
 Nikolai Ivanov (entrepreneur) (1836–1906), Russian businessman
 Nikolay Ivanov (politician, born 1952), Russian politician
 Nikolay Ivanov (politician, born 1957), Russian politician
 Nikola Ivanov (footballer) (born 1988) is a Bulgarian footballer
 Nikolay Ivanov (footballer) (born 1980), Russian footballer
 Nikolai Ivanov (football referee) (born  1964), Russian football referee
 Nikolai Ivanov (general) (1851-1919), Russian artillery general
 Nikolai Ivanov (mathematician) (born 1954), Russian mathematician
 Nikolay Ivanov (rower) (1949–2012), Soviet Russian Olympic rower
 Nikolay Ivanov (skier) (born 1971), Kazakhstani Olympic skier
 Nikolay Ivanov (sprinter) (born 1942), Russian Olympic sprinter
 Nikolay Ivanov (volleyball) (born 1972), Bulgarian volleyball player
 Nikolai Ivanov (pilot), Soviet flying ace
 Mikalay Ivanow (born 2000), Belarusian footballer
 Nikolai Ivanov, the central character of the 1887 play Ivanov by Anton Chekhov